P.S. «I Sparti», short for Podosferikós Sýllogos «I Sparti» is a Greek football club, based in Pellana, Laconia, Greece. The club currently competes in the Gamma Ethniki, the third tier of the Greek football league system.

History

The club was founded in 2010 as Athlitiki Enosi Pellana-Kastoreio, enjoying relative success in the region as they won the Laconia FCA Cup in 2013. In 2018, they were promoted to the Gamma Ethniki, the third tier of the Greek football league system for the first time in their history after winning the Laconia regional championship. On 12 August 2019, the club was renamed as Néos Podosferikós Sýllogos Dímou Spartis.

Honours

Domestic Titles and Honours

 Laconia FCA Champion: 1
 2017–18
 Laconia FCA Cup Winners: 1
 2012–13

Players

Current squad

References

Football clubs in Peloponnese (region)
Florina (regional unit)
Association football clubs established in 2010
2010 establishments in Greece
Gamma Ethniki clubs